Tracy Brown (born 1974) is an American author.

Tracy Brown or Tracey Brown may also refer to:

 Tracey Brown (born 1967), Canadian country music artist
 Tracey Brown (scientist), director of a UK charity
 Tracy Brown-May (born 1967), American politician

See also
 Tracey Browning (born 1963), Australian basketball player
 Trace (disambiguation)
 Tracie (disambiguation)
 Tracy (disambiguation)
 Brown (disambiguation)
 Browne, a surname